Sectarian violence in Pakistan refers to attacks and counter-attacks against people and places in Pakistan motivated by antagonism toward the target's sect, usually a religious extremist group. Targets in Pakistan include the Shia, Barelvis, Sunnis, Sufis, Ahmadis, Hindus and small groups of Deobandis. As many as 4,000 people are estimated to have been killed by Shia-Sunni sectarian attacks in Pakistan between 1987–2007. And since 2008, thousands of Shia have been killed by Sunni extremists according to Human Rights Watch (HRW). 
One significant aspect of the attacks in Pakistan is that militants often target Sunni and Shia places of worship during prayers in order to maximize fatalities and to "emphasize the religious dimensions of their attack".
Human Rights Watch also states that in 2011 and 2012, Pakistan minority groups including Hindus, Ahmadi, and Christians "faced unprecedented insecurity and persecution in the country". Attacks on Sufi shrines by Salafis have also been reported.

Among those blamed for the sectarian violence in the country are mainly Deobandi militant groups, such as the Sipah-e-Sahaba (SSP), the Tehrik-e-Taliban Pakistan (TTP), and Jundallah (affiliates of Islamic State of Iraq and the Levant). Tehrik-i-Taliban Pakistan "has claimed responsibility for most of the attacks" on Shia according to Human Rights Watch. Salafi militant groups are also blamed for attacks on Shias, Barelvis and Sufis.

Religions and sects
Shia and Sunni
Estimates of the size of the two largest religious groups in Pakistan vary. According to the Library of Congress, Pew Research Center, Oxford University, the CIA World Factbook, and other experts, adherents of Shi'a Islam in Pakistan make up between 9-15% of the population of Pakistan while the remaining 70–75% are Sunni.

Pakistan, like India, is said to have at least 16 million Shias. Globally, Shia Islam constitutes 10–20% of the total Muslims, while the remaining 80%–90% practice Sunni Islam. Of the Sunni, the majority follow the Barelvi school, while 15-25% follow the Deobandi school of jurisprudence.

Ahmadi and Sunni

An estimated 0.22%-2.2% of the population are Ahmadi, who were designated 'non-Muslims' by a 1974 constitutional amendment, although they consider themselves Muslims, due to pressure from Sunni extremist groups.

Other groups
Hinduism is the second largest religion in Pakistan after Islam, according to the 1998 Census. Non-Muslim religions also include Christianity, which has 2,800,000 (1.6%) adherents as of 2005. The Bahá'í Faith claims 30,000, followed by Sikhs, Buddhists and Parsis, each claiming 20,000 adherents, and a very small community of Jains.

Intra-Muslim sectarianism

Barelvis
Barelvis form the majority within the Sunni sect, while the Deobandis form 15-25%. However, the Barelvis have been targeted and killed by Deobandi groups in Pakistan such as the TTP, SSP, and Lashkar-e-Taiba. Suicide attacks, vandalism and destruction of sites considered holy to those in the Barelvi movement have been perpetrated by Deobandi extremist groups. This includes attacks, destruction and vandalism of Data Darbar in Lahore, Abdullah Shah Ghazi's tomb in Karachi, Khal Magasi in Balochistan, and Rahman Baba's tomb in Peshawar. The murder of various Barelvi leaders have also been committed by Deobandi terrorists.

Barelvi clerics claim that there is a bias against them in various Pakistani establishments such as the DHA, who tend to appoint Deobandi Imams for mosques in their housing complexes rather that Barelvi ones. Historical landmarks such as Badshahi Masjid also have Deobandi Imams, which is a fact that has been used as evidence by Barelvi clerics for bias against Barelvis in Pakistan. The Milade Mustafa Welfare Society has asserted that the Religious Affairs Department of DHA interferes with Human Resources to ensure that Deobandi Imams are selected for mosques in their housing complex.

In April 2006, the entire leadership of two prominent Barelvi outfits, the Sunni Tehreek and Jamaat Ahle Sunnat were killed in a bomb attack in the Nishtar Park bombing, in Pakistan's largest city and business hub Karachi.
On 12 June 2009, Sarfraz Ahmed Naeemi, a prominent cleric of the Barelvi sect and outspoken critic of the Tehrik-i-Taliban Pakistan was killed in a suicide bombing. Between 2005 and 2010, hundreds of Barelvi sect members have been killed in more than 70 suicide attacks at different religious shrines.

Shias

After the demise of Jinnah, the prime minister of Pakistan, Nawabzada Liaquat Ali Khan, allied with the ulema and passed the Objectives Resolution and adopted the Islam as state religion. Jinnah's appointed law minister, Jogendra Nath Mandal, resigned from his post. Shias of Pakistan allege discrimination by the Pakistani government since 1948, claiming that Sunnis are given preference in business, official positions and administration of justice. Although the sectarian hateful literature has been pouring into Punjab since Shah Abd al-Aziz wrote his Tuhfa Asna Ashariya, however, major incidents of anti-Shia violence began only after mass migration in 1947. Many students of Molana Abdul Shakoor Farooqi and Molana Hussain Ahmad Madani migrated to Pakistan and either set up seminaries here or became part of the Tanzim-e-Ahle-Sunnat (TAS) or Jamiat Ulema-i-Islam (JUI). They travelled through the length and breadth of the country and called for attacks on Azadari and wrote books and tracts against it. Among them were: Molana Noorul Hasan Bukhari, Molana Dost Muhammad Qureshi, Molana Abdus Sattar Taunsavi, Molana Mufti Mahmood, Molana Abdul Haq Haqqani, Molana Sarfaraz Khan Safdar Gakharvi, and Molana Manzoor Ahmad Naumani. The sectarian clashes of Lucknow had attracted zealous workers of religious parties from Punjab and KPK, but with influx of sectarian clergy, the religious sectarianism and narrow-mindedness of UP was injected to Sufism-oriented Punjab and Sindh.

In the 1950s, Tanzim-e-Ahle-Sunnat started to arrange public gatherings all over Pakistan to incite violence and mock Shia sanctities. TAS issued an anti-Shia monthly, called Da’wat. In Muharram 1955, attacks took place on at least 25 places in Punjab. In 1956, thousands of armed villagers gathered to attack Azadari in the small town of Shahr Sultan, but were stopped by Police from killing. On 7 August 1957, three Shias were killed during an attack in Sitpur village. Blaming the victim, TAS demanded that government should ban the thousand years old tradition of Azadari, because it caused rioting and bloodshed. In May 1958, a Shia orator Agha Mohsin was target-killed in Bhakkar. Police needed to be appointed to many places, the scenario became more like in the pre-partition Urdu Speaking areas. It is important to note here that the Shia ulema were becoming part of religious alliances and not supporting secularism. The syllabus taught at Shia seminaries does not include any course on the history of the subcontinent. Shia clerics don't have an independent political vision: they were strengthening the puritanism which was going to deprive Shias of basic human rights, like equality, peace and freedom.

Ayyub Khan enforced Martial Law in 1958. In the 1960s, Shias started to face state persecution when Azadari processions were banned at some places and the ban was lifted only after protests. In Lahore, the main procession of Mochi gate was forced to change its route. After Martial Law was lifted in 1962, anti-Shia hate propaganda started again, both in the form of books and weekly papers. The Deobandi organisation, Tanzim-e-Ahle-Sunnat, demanded the Azadari to be limited to Shia ghetto's. Following Muharram, on 3 June 1963, two Shias were killed and over a hundred injured in an attack on Ashura procession in Lahore. In a small town of Tehri in the Khairpur District of Sindh, 120 Shias were slaughtered. The press did not cover the incidents properly, as the identity of both the perpetrators and the victims, and their objective was concealed. On 16 June, six Deobandi organisations arranged a public meeting in Lahore where they blamed the victims for the violence. In July, a commission was appointed to inquire into the riots. Its report was published in December that year, but it too did not name any individual or organisation. Nobody was punished. Mahmood Ahmad Abbasi, Abu Yazid Butt, Qamar-ud-Din Sialvi and others wrote books against Shias.

In 1969, Ashura procession was attacked in Jhang. On 26 February 1972, Ashura procession was stone pelted on in Dera Ghazi Khan. In May 1973, the Shia neighbourhood of Gobindgarh in Sheikhupura district was attacked by Deobandi mob. There were troubles in Parachinar and Gilgit too. In 1974, Shia villages were attacked in Gilgit by armed Deobandi men. January 1975 saw several attacks on Shia processions in Karachi, Lahore, Chakwal and Gilgit. In a village Babu Sabu near Lahore, three Shias were killed and many were left injured.

On the other hand, Mufti Mahmood, Molana Samiul Haq, Ihsan Illahi Zaheer and others wrote and spoke furiously against Shias. Molana Samilul Haq wrote in the editorial of Al-Haq magazine:

"We must also remember that Shias consider it their religious duty to harm and eliminate the Ahle-Sunna .... the Shias have always conspired to convert Pakistan to a Shia state ... They have been conspiring with our foreign enemies and with the Jews. It was through such conspiracies that the Shias masterminded the separation of East Pakistan and thus satiated their thirst for the blood of the Sunnis".

The liberation struggle of Bangladesh was instigated by economic and cultural grievances, not religion. The religious reality is that the Shia population of Bangladesh was less than 1%, and similarly the Mukti Bahni was pre-dominantly Sunni. The members of Al-Badr and Al-Shams, the jihadi militias set up by Pakistan armed forces to crush the Bengali fighters, were recruited from Jamaat-i-Islami and followed wahhabist form of Islam preached by followers of Syed Ahmad Barelvi and Shah Ismael Dihlavi. Shias of Pakistan form a small minority in civil and military services and they too try to downplay their religious identity for fears of discrimination.

After Zia's takeover in 1977, the influence of socialism and modernism started to wane and religious parties felt empowered by Zia's islamization program. They began to recruit workers and volunteers. In February 1978, Ali Basti, a Shia neighborhood in Karachi, was attacked by a Deobandi mob and 5 men were killed. Next Muharram, in 1978, Azadari processions were attacked in Lahore and Karachi leaving 22 Shias dead. After Soviet Union invaded Afghanistan in 1979, the country became a safe haven for Shia phobic militants. They could now train in the name of Afghan Jihad, kill Shias and go to Afghanistan in hiding. The number of hate crimes against the Shias increased. During Muharram 1980, the Afghan Refugees settled near Parachinar attacked Shia villages and in 1981, they expelled Shias from Sada. At that time, Kurram Militia was employed in Kurram Agency and they successfully contained this violence. In 1983, Shias neighbourhoods of Karachi were attacked on Eid Milad-un-Nabi. 94 houses were set on fire, 10 Shias were killed. On Muharram 1983, there were again attacks on Shias in Karachi. On 6 July 1985, police opened fire on a Shia demonstration in Quetta, killing 17 Shias. Shias responded and 11 attackers were killed. According to police report, among the 11 attackers who died in the clash only 2 were identified as police sepoys and 9 were civilian Deobandis wearing fake police uniforms. In Muharram 1986, 7 Shias were killed in Punjab, 4 in Lahore, 3 in Layyah. In July 1987, Shias of Parachinar, who were ready to defend, were attacked by the Afghan Mujahideen again and as a result, 52 Shias and 120 attackers lost their lives. In 1988, Shia procession was banned in Dera Ismail Khan and 9 unarmed Shia civilians were shot dead while defying the ban. The government had to restore the procession. In the 1988 Gilgit Massacre, Osama bin Laden-led Sunni tribals assaulted, massacred and raped Shia civilians in Gilgit after being inducted by the Pakistan Army to quell a Shia uprising in Gilgit.

It is important to note here that it was not Zia, but Liaquat Ali Khan who had patronised the perpetrators of Lucknow sectarianism and started the process of Islamization. Ayyub Khan not only alienated Bengalis but also promoted a historical narrative of Ghulam Ahmad Pervaiz, a conspiracy theorist who attacked Shias in his books like Shahkaar-e-Risalat. Long before Zia, the two-nation theory of Jinnah had been attributed to Ahmad Sirhindi and Shah Waliullah. These hate preachers were presented as heroes and real founders of Pakistan in Syllabus.

Other significant event was the Islamic revolution of Iran. It indirectly strengthened the Islamists in Pakistan. Molana Maududi's Jamaat-e-Islami shared common ideas of political Islamism. They were the first to support it and publish Khomeini's writings and speeches in Pakistan. Shias did not support this revolution until 1985, when Molana Arif al-Hussaini assumed leadership of the Shia organisation Tehreek-e-Jafariya. Molana Manzoor Ahmad Naumani had been writing against Jamaat-e-Islami for long time. Fearing that this revolution might actually empower Jamaat-i-Islami and the Shias, he obtained funding from Rabta Aalam-i-Islami of Saudi Arabia and wrote a book against Shias and Khomeini. Meanwhile, Molana Nurul Hasan Bukhari and Attaullah Shah Bukhari had died and Taznim-e-Ahle-Sunnat (TAS) was in a bad shape. The need for its re-organization was met by another Deobandi cleric of lower rank, Molana Haq Nawaz Jhangvi from Punjab. With same ideology and support base, he chose the name Anjuman Sipah-e-Sahaba (ASS) and later changed it to Sipah-e-Sahaba Pakistan (SSP).

Just as the Soviet forces were leaving Afghanistan, a wave of civil disobedience and protests erupted in Kashmir.  Pakistan decided to send in the Jihadis trained for Afghan Jihad. The followers of Syed Ahmad Barelvi's puritanical form of Islam were trained at Balakot, the place where he was killed while fleeing the joint Sikh-Pashtun attack in 1831. New organisations, like Hizbul Mujahideen, were set up, but their members were drawn from the ideological spheres of Deobandi seminaries and Jamaat-e-islami. This made matters worse for Shias in Pakistan, as the jihadis trained for Kashmir used to come home and act as part-time sectarian terrorists. The state initially turned a blind eye. Sipah-e-Sahaba became more lethal, and the incidents of Shia killing became more organised and more targeted. Shia intellecticide began in the 1990s: doctors, engineers, professors, businessmen, clerics, lawyers, civil servants and other men of learning were being listed and murdered. Mainstream media, either under fear of jihadists or out of ideological orientation of majority of journalists, chose to hide the identity of Shia victims and create false binaries which made it difficult for the people to understand the gravity of the situation and researchers and human rights activists to gather the correct data and form a realistic narrative. Another tactic deployed for this strategy of confusion was to change the names of sectarian outfits: in the 1980s Tanzim-e-Ahlesunnat (TAS) had come to be known as Sipahe Sahaba (SSP), in the 1990s a new umbrella was set up under the name of Lashkar-e-Jhangvi (LeJ), whose members, if caught red-handed, were supported by SSP's lawyers and funding.

In 2001, after the September 11 attacks on the Twin Towers in the United States, Pakistan decided to join America in her war against terrorism. President Musharraf banned Lashkar-e-Jhangvi and Sipah-e-Muhammad. In October 2001, Mufti Nizam al-Din Shamzai, a renowned Deobandi religious authority, issued a fatwa calling for Jihad against the US and Pakistani States. This fatwa justified means by ends and apostatised government employees as infidels. The fourth point of the fatwa reads:

"All those governments of the Muslim countries who side with America in this crusade, and putting on their disposal the land and resources, or sharing intelligence with them, are no more legitimate. It is a duty of every Muslim to bring these governments down, by any means possible".

It has been quoted by the terrorists groups as religious justification of their acts of violence, such as targeting government offices and spreading chaos through suicide bombings. The prime targets of these attacks have been the Shia Muslims.

The incidents of violence in cities occur more often than in rural areas. This is because the urban middle class is easy to radicalise, especially the people migrating from rural areas to seek refuge in religious organisations to fight the urban culture and to look for new friends of similar rural mindset. Increasing urbanisation was one of the root causes of the violence in Lucknow in the 1930s. Justin Jones says:

"one of the greatest contributing social factors to Shi'a-Sunni conflict throughout the 1930s was the massive shift of population and demography taking place in Lucknow. Before the 1920s, colonial Lucknow had been slow to modernise and remained largely stagnant both in terms of economic and population growth. However, Lucknow's quick development thereafter into a major provincial centre of industry and trade saw the city's population spiral after 1921 from some 217,000 to 387,000 in just twenty years".

In July 2020, the Punjab Legislative Assembly of Pakistan passed the Tahaffuz-e-Bunyad-e-Islam (Protection of Foundation of Islam) Bill, making it mandatory for all Pakistanis to identically revere esteemed Sunni figures as the only acceptable version of Islam in Pakistan. The passing of the bill sparked outrage among the Shia clergy that the bill was contrary to Shia beliefs.

In August 2020, about 42 blasphemy cases were registered primarily targeting Shias including a three-year-old Shia child.

Thousands of Pakistanis marched for an anti-Shia protest in Karachi, the country's financial hub, on 11 September 2020, also the death anniversary of Muhammad Ali Jinnah, founder of Pakistan and himself a Shia. The march was caused due to Shia clergies making disparaging remarks against historical Islamic figures. The remarks were televised during the Shia Ashura procession. Ashura commemorates the Battle of Karbala, which caused the schism in Islam. Sunni groups demanded that disparaging remarks against any Islamic figures were not acceptable and will not be tolerated.

Deobandis
Deobandis have alleged a bias towards Barelvis by the Punjab Government.
In December 2011, Deobandi clerics said that over the past 3 years, 19 of their mosques had been illegally occupied by Barelvis. They also alleged that Pakistan intelligence agencies were harassing their followers and as a consequence, boycotted a meeting on Muharram to promote harmony between Muslim sects.

On 18 May 2000, leading Deobandi leader and scholar Mullah Muhammad Yusuf Ludhianvi, who taught at one of Pakistan's largest Deobandi seminaries, the Jamia Uloom-ul-Islamia, was gunned down by unidentified attackers in Karachi, in a suspected targeted sectarian killing.

On 30 May 2004, religious scholar Mufti Nizamuddin Shamzai, Shaykh al-Hadith of Jamia Uloom-ul-Islamia was assassinated in Karachi.

On 22 March 2020, an assassination attempt was made on prominent intellectual leader and religious scholar of the Deobandi movement Mufti Muhammad Taqi Usmani which he survived.

On 10 October 2020, prominent religious scholar Maulana Muhammad Adil Khan, head of Jamia Farooqia was gunned down by unidentified attackers in Karachi in apparent sectarian violence.

Sufism

In two years, 2010 and 2011, 128 people were killed and 443 were injured in 22 attacks on shrines and tombs of saints and religious people in Pakistan, most of them Sufi in orientation.

Sufism, a mystical Islamic tradition, has a long history and a large popular following in Pakistan. Popular Sufi culture is centred on Thursday night gatherings at shrines and annual festivals which feature Sufi music and dance. Contemporary Islamic fundamentalists criticise its popular character, which in their view, does not accurately reflect the teachings and practice of the Prophet and his companions.

Ahmadis

Ahmadi Muslims were declared to be 'Non-Muslims' by the Bhutto government which gave into Sunni extremist pressure in 1974 and they were further deprived of their basic religious rights in the Second Amendment to the Constitution of Pakistan and Ordinance XX which has led to thousands of cases of Ahmadis being charged with various offences for alleged blasphemy and further fueled the Sectarian tensions which exist in Pakistan. Many thousands of Ahmadis were killed in the 1953 Lahore riots, in the 1974 Anti-Ahmadiyya riots and the May 2010 attacks on Ahmadi mosques in Lahore. The 1953 riots were the largest killings of Ahmadis.
In 2014, a prominent Canadian national surgeon, Dr. Mehdi Ali Qamar was killed in front of his family while he was on a humanitarian visit to Pakistan, one of 137 other Ahmadis who were killed in Pakistan from 2010–2014.

Following the 2010 Lahore massacre, United Nations Secretary-General Ban Ki-moon, said "Members of this religious community have faced continuous threats, discrimination and violent attacks in Pakistan. There is a real risk that similar violence might happen again unless advocacy of religious hatred that constitutes incitement to discrimination, hostility or violence is adequately addressed. The Government must take every step to ensure the security of members of all religious minorities and their places of worship so as to prevent any recurrence of today's dreadful incident." Ban's spokesperson expressed condemndation and extended his condolences to the families of the victims and to the Government.

Christians

A Christian church in Islamabad was attacked after 11 September 2001, and some Americans were among the dead.

On 22 September 2013, a twin suicide bomb attack took place at All Saints Church in Peshawar, Pakistan, in which 127 people were killed and over 250 injured. On 15 March 2015, two blasts took place at Roman Catholic Church and Christ Church during Sunday service at Youhanabad town of Lahore. At least 15 people were killed and seventy were wounded in the attacks.

Hindus

 Hindus in Pakistan have faced persecution due to their religious beliefs. Because of this, some of them choose to take refuge in next-door India. According to the Human Rights Commission of Pakistan data, just around 1,000 Hindu families fled to India in 2013. In May 2014, a member of the ruling Pakistan Muslim League-Nawaz (PML-N), Dr Ramesh Kumar Vankwani, revealed in the National Assembly of Pakistan that around 5,000 Hindus are migrating from Pakistan to India every year.

Those Pakistani Hindus who have fled to India allege that Hindu girls are sexually harassed in Pakistani schools, adding that Hindu students are made to read the Quran and that their religious practices are mocked. The Indian government is planning to issue Aadhaar cards and PAN cards to Pakistani Hindu refugees, and simplifying the process by which they can acquire Indian citizenship.

Persecution 

Separate electorates for Hindus and Christians were established in 1985 – a policy originally proposed by Islamist leader Abul A'la Maududi. Christian and Hindu leaders complained that they felt excluded from the county's political process, but the policy had strong support from Islamists.

In the aftermath of the Babri Masjid demolition Pakistani Hindus faced riots. Mobs attacked five Hindu temples in Karachi and set fire to 25 temples in towns across the province of Sindh. Shops owned by Hindus were also attacked in Sukkur. Hindu homes and temples were also attacked in Quetta.

In 2005, 32 Hindus were killed by firing from the government side near Nawab Akbar Bugti's residence during bloody clashes between Bugti tribesmen and paramilitary forces in Balochistan. The firing left the Hindu residential locality near Bugti's residence badly hit.

The rise of Taliban insurgency in Pakistan has been an influential and increasing factor in the persecution of and discrimination against religious minorities in Pakistan, such as Hindus, Christians, Sikhs, and other minorities. It is said that there is persecution of religious minorities in Pakistan.

In July 2010, around 60 members of the minority Hindu community in Karachi were attacked and evicted from their homes following an incident of a Dalit Hindu youth drinking water from a tap near an Islamic mosque.

In January 2014, a policeman standing guard outside a Hindu temple at Peshawar was gunned down. Pakistan's Supreme Court has sought a report from the government on its efforts to ensure access for the minority Hindu community to temples – the Karachi bench of the apex court was hearing applications against the alleged denial of access to the members of the minority community.

Sikhs
The Sikh community of Pakistan has faced persecution in the form of targeted killings, forced conversions and denied opportunities. Sikhs are also  forced to pay the discriminatory jizya, (protection money to be allowed to continue practicing their faith), and as per reports, Sikhs who have refused to pay jizya have been killed publicly.

Thousands of Sikhs have emigrated to safer countries like India. As per rights campaigners, the population of Sikhs in Pakistan has dropped from 2 million in 1947 to around 40,000 in 2002 and 8,000 in 2019.

Others
In December 2021, a mob in Pakistan tortured, killed and then set on fire a Sri Lankan man who was accused of blasphemy over some posters he had allegedly taken down.
Priyantha Diyawadana, a Sri Lankan national who worked as general manager of a factory of the industrial engineering company Rajco Industries in Sialkot, Punjab, was set upon by a violent crowd on Friday.

See also

 Iran-Saudi Arabia proxy conflict
 Anti-Bihari sentiment
Blasphemy in Pakistan
International propagation of Salafism and Wahhabism
Islamic fundamentalism in Iran
 Islam in Pakistan
 Minorities in Pakistan
 Pakistani demographics
 Persecution of Shia Muslims
 Persecution of Ahmadiyya
 Persecution of Hindus
 Religion in Pakistan
 Freedom of religion in Pakistan
 Religious discrimination in Pakistan
 Sectarian violence among Muslims
 Shia–Sunni relations
 Sunni Tehreek
 Tehrik-e-Jafria
 2003 Quetta mosque bombing
 September 2010 Quetta bombing
 Takfir
Pakistani textbooks controversy

Bibliography 

 Saif, Mashal. The 'Ulama in Contemporary Pakistan: Contesting and Cultivating an Islamic Republic. United Kingdom, Cambridge University Press, 2020.

References

History of Pakistan
Islam in Pakistan
Religiously motivated violence in Pakistan
Schisms in Islam
Shia Islam in Pakistan
Christianity in Pakistan
Hinduism in Pakistan
Sikhism in Pakistan
Conflicts in 2022
Persecution by Muslims
Pakistan